PP-26 Jhelum-II is a Constituency of Provincial Assembly of Punjab.

General elections 2018

{| class="wikitable sortable"
|-
! colspan=2 | Party Affiliation !! Candidate !! Votes !! Percentage !! Change
|-

General elections 2013

{| class="wikitable sortable"
|-
! colspan=2 | Party Affiliation !! Contesting Candidates !! Votes !! Percentage !! Change
|-

General elections 2008

See also
 PP-25 Jhelum-I
 PP-27 Jhelum-III

References

External links
 Election commission Pakistan's official website
 Awazoday.com check result
 Official Website of Government of Punjab

Provincial constituencies of Punjab, Pakistan